This is a list of members of the South Australian Legislative Council from 1968 to 1970.

 Labor MLC Stan Bevan resigned on 4 May 1970. Tom Casey was elected to fill the vacancy on 15 May.

References
Parliament of South Australia — Statistical Record of the Legislature

Members of South Australian parliaments by term
20th-century Australian politicians